Cecil Edward Fagan (3 October 1899 – 31 March 1977) was an Irish water polo player. He competed in the men's tournament at the 1924 Summer Olympics.

References

External links
 

1899 births
1977 deaths
Irish male water polo players
Olympic water polo players of Ireland
Water polo players at the 1924 Summer Olympics